La Ronciere Island (also known as Ronser Island, is an island in Franz Josef Land, Russia.

History
This island was named by the Austro-Hungarian North Pole Expedition after Captain La Ronciere Le Noury, a French courier for Austro-Hungarian Emperor Franz Joseph.

On some maps La Ronciere Island appears as "Whitney Island", after American Arctic financier William Collins Whitney. This name was given by the American explorer Evelyn Briggs Baldwin, but the Austro-Hungarian explorers who discovered Franz Josef land had named this island first.

Geography
It is almost completely glaciarized except for two small points by the shore in the northeast and in the west.

Adjacent islands

Geddes Island
This barely  island was named after Scottish polar scientist Sir Patrick Geddes.

This same island was named Hayden Island (Остров Гайдана; Ostrov Gaydana), after pioneering American geologist Ferdinand Vandeveer Hayden, by the Ziegler-Fiala expedition.

See also 
 List of islands of Russia

References

External links 
 Franz Josef Land (in Russian)

Islands of Franz Josef Land
Uninhabited islands of Russia